The men's high jump event at the 1928 Olympic Games took place July 29. Thirty-five athletes from 17 nations competed. The maximum number of athletes per nation was 4. Bob King won the final with a jump of 1.94 metres. Four other competitors cleared 1.91 metres, and their placement was decided via a jump-off. King's victory was the United States' eighth consecutive victory in the men's high jump; Benjamin Hedges's silver made it the third straight Games in which Americans went 1–2. Claude Ménard earned France's second consecutive bronze medal in the event.

Background

This was the eighth appearance of the event, which is one of 12 athletics events to have been held at every Summer Olympics. The returning finalists from the 1924 Games were gold medalist Harold Osborn of the United States and bronze medalist (and 1920 finalist) Pierre Lewden of France. While Osborn was defending champion and world record holder, his countryman Bob King was undefeated in 1928.

Argentina, Lithuania, the Philippines, Romania, and Turkey each made their debut in the event. The United States appeared for the eighth time, having competed at each edition of the Olympic men's high jump to that point.

Competition format

The competition used the two-round format introduced in 1912. There were two distinct rounds of jumping with results cleared between rounds. The qualifying round had the bar set at 1.60 metres, 1.70 metres, 1.77 metres, and 1.83 metres. All jumpers clearing 1.83 metres in the qualifying round advanced to the final. In the final, the bar was set at 1.70 metres, 1.80 metres, 1.84 metres, 1.88 metres, and then increased by .03 metres at a time. There were jump-offs in the final to resolve ties through sixth place.

Records

These were the standing world and Olympic records (in metres) prior to the 1928 Summer Olympics.

No new world or Olympic records were set during the competition.

Schedule

Results

Qualifying

All jumpers clearing 1.83 meters advanced to the final round. Jump sequences are not known.

Final

Jump sequences are not known. Jump-offs were conducted for 2nd through 5th place and for 6th place.

References

Men's high jump
High jump at the Olympics
Men's events at the 1928 Summer Olympics